Hans Demmelmeier  (1 May 1887 - 5 September 1973) was a German politician and jurist, representative of the Christian Social Union of Bavaria and Bavarian People's Party. He represented Ingolstadt in the Bundestag.

See also
List of Bavarian Christian Social Union politicians

References

Bavarian People's Party politicians
1887 births
1973 deaths
People from Pfaffenhofen (district)
Members of the Bundestag for Bavaria
Members of the Bundestag 1953–1957
Members of the Bundestag 1949–1953
Members of the Bundestag for the Christian Social Union in Bavaria